Ulva is an island in the Inner Hebrides, Scotland.

Ulva may also refer to:

Ulva Belsham (1921–2011), New Zealand telegraphist and radio operator
Ulva Island (New Zealand)
 New Ulva, on Island of Danna, in the Inner Hebrides, Scotland
 Sea lettuce, the genus Ulva

See also
 Uvula
 Vulva